A naboot (nabboot, asaya, asa, shoum) is a quarterstaff constructed of palm wood or rattan. It originated in Egypt and is used in the martial art of Tahtib.

References
Article about Tahtib, denoting the specifications for a naboot.
Similar article that talks about the origins of Tahtib, including historical references

Ancient weapons
Ceremonial weapons
Martial arts equipment
Polearms
Stick and staff weapons
Weapons of Egypt